Greece competed at the 2011 World Championships in Athletics from August 27 to September 4 in Daegu, South Korea.
A team of 12 athletes (7 men and 5 women) represented the country in the event.

Results

Men

Women

See also
Greece at the IAAF World Championships in Athletics

References

External links
Official local organising committee website
Official IAAF competition website

Nations at the 2011 World Championships in Athletics
World Championships in Athletics
Greece at the World Championships in Athletics